The tomb of Darius the Great (or Darius I) is one of the four tombs for Achaemenid kings at the historical site of Naqsh-e Rostam, located about  northwest of Persepolis in Iran. They are all situated at a considerable height above ground-level.

The tomb

One of the tombs is explicitly identified by an accompanying inscription to be the tomb of Darius I. The other three tombs are believed to be those of Xerxes I, Artaxerxes I, and Darius II; the fifth tomb (incomplete) might be that of Artaxerxes III or the last Achaemenid king, Darius III. The tombs were looted extensively following the conquest of Persia by Alexander the Great.

The inscriptions

DNa inscription

Its exact date is not known, but it is assumed to be from the last decade of his reign. Like several other of Darius' inscriptions, the territories controlled by the Achaemenid Persian Empire (which reached its territorial zenith under Darius' rule) are clearly listed.

DNe inscription

The nationalities mentioned in the DNa inscription are also depicted on the upper registers of all the tombs at Naqsh-e Rostam (starting with the tomb of Darius I) as a group of 30 Achaemenid soldiers who are in their native clothing and bearing weapons while supporting the platform on which the King of Kings stands for his devotion to Ahuramazda, the highest deity of Zoroastrianism. One of the best preserved friezes is that of Xerxes I.

All of the 30 soldiers on the tomb of Darius further have trilingual labels over them for their ethnic identification, known collectively as the DNe inscription in scholarly works. One of the last rulers of the Achaemenid dynasty, Artaxerxes II, also uses the same labels over the soldiers as depicted on his own tomb in Persepolis. These are known collectively as the "A2Pa Inscription".

The inscription identifies the ethnicity of all 30 soldiers:

The nationalities of the soldiers depicted on the reliefs and mentioned in the individual labels of the DNe inscription are, from left to right: Makan, Persian, Median, Elamite, Parthian, Arian
Bactrian, Sogdian, Choresmian, Zarangian, Arachosian, Sattagydian, Gandharan, Hindush, Saka (Haumavarga), Saka (Tigraxauda), Babylonian, Assyrian, Arab, Egyptian, Armenian, Cappadocian, Lydian, Ionian, Saka "beyond the sea", Skudrian (Thracian), Macedonian, Libyan, Nubian, and Carian.

Gallery

See also 
 Achaemenid architecture
 Cities of the ancient Near East
 List of colossal sculpture in situ
 Naqsh-e Rajab

References

Bibliography 
 
 Hubertus von Gall "NAQŠ-E ROSTAM" in Encyclopædia Iranica

External links 

 Herzfeld Papers, Series 5: Drawings and Maps, Records of Naqsh-i Rustam Collections Search Center, S.I.R.I.S., Smithsonian Institution, Washington, D.C.

5th-century BC religious buildings and structures
3rd-century religious buildings and structures
Naqsh-e Rustam
Marvdasht complex
Achaemenid architecture
Tombs in Iran
Darius the Great
Rock-cut tombs